Bhairab Pyankhan. "Bhairava's Dance" is an ancient masked dance performed by Newar community in the Pokhara Valley of Nepal as part of the Bhairab Jatra festival and named after Bhairab Bhairava, an aspect of Shiva.

History
It was originated in Bhaktapur and brought to Pokhara while migrating. Although it was performed every 12 years in Bhaktapur, it is performed every 6 years in  pokhara valley to better fulfill its cultural role.

It was brought more than 236 years ago by Jitaram from Bhaktapur according to the guru Late Mr. Sarbagyaman Pradhananga . The rag (song)in this dance indicates that it was started at the time of last Malla King of Bhaktapur, Ranajit Malla.

Dancers
There are 12 deities in this dance, namely Dagini (Dakini), Kwancha, Bhuccha, Bhairab, Kali Bhairab (Budi Bhairab), Indrayani, Barah (Varah), Kumari, Bishnuvi (Vaishnavi), Bramhayani (Brahmani), Maheswori (Gauri) and Ganesh (Ganesha). Bhairab leads and conducts the dance. Before the dance all performers bathe and wear ceremonial clothes and mask (Khawpa). After wearing the mask no performer can speak until it is taken out.

The dance is started at the Bhairab Temple in the evening and after a couple of rounds and puja it is taken to the hosting place where it is performed for around six hours including puja.

At first all 12 gods dance. After the puja is complete then individual dance starts. First is Bhairab with Kwancha and Bhuccha which is like a child and adult play. It is called a Jyoti Naach. After that Bhairab, Kali, Indrayani and Barah come. It lasts almost one hour and called a Char Bhairab. It is an energetic dance and most people love to watch this part of the dance. Then come Kumari, Bishnuvi, Bramhayani and Ganga. Then Ganesh dances solo. Then come Kwancha and Bhuchha, again with their like childlike playing. At the end comes Dagini. In the closing act all 12 Bhairabs participate.  Then the ending puja is performed and they return to the Bhairab Temple.

Other similar dances
Comparable dances include the Mahakali Naach of Bhaktapur; the Devi Naach of Kilaghal Tole; the Lakhe Naach of Majipat Tole and the Layaku Bhaila (Royal Bhairab) of Madhyapur Thimi.

Gallery

External links

 Bhairab Naach Videos in Youtube
 Shaphalya Amatya, Some aspects of cultural policy in Nepal, UNESCO, p. 13
 Pokhareli Festival Bhairab Naach

Asian dances
Newar
Masked dances
Kaski District
Dance in Nepal
Nepalese folk dances
Culture of Bagmati